The Fire Department Headquarters-Fire Alarm Headquarters is an historic structure located in the Bloomingdale neighborhood in Washington, D.C.  It was listed on both the District of Columbia Inventory of Historic Sites and on the National Register of Historic Places in 2011.  The building was designed by Nathan C. Wyeth and built in 1939 along the McMillan Reservoir.

References

Government buildings completed in 1939
Government buildings on the National Register of Historic Places in Washington, D.C.